The 2011–12 Liga Gimel season saw 95 clubs competing in 6 regional divisions for promotion to Liga Bet.

Bnei Maghar (Upper Galilee), F.C. Tzeirei Tur'an (Jezreel), Hapoel Umm al-Fahm (Samaria), Hapoel Morasha Ramat HaSharon (Sharon), Otzma F.C. Holon (Tel Aviv) and Ironi Modi'in (Central) all won their respective divisions and were promoted to Liga Bet.

During the summer, as several vacancies were created in Liga Bet, runners-up Beitar Petah Tikva (Sharon), Bnei Yehud (Tel Aviv) and Beitar Givat Ze'ev (Central) were also promoted to Liga Bet.

Upper Galilee Division

Jezreel Division

During the season, Hapoel Tzeirei Basmat Tab'un (after 11 matches) and Hapoel Ka'abiyye (after 12 matches) folded and their results were annulled.

Samaria Division

During the season, Hapoel Bnei Zemer (after 3 matches), Hapoel Ironi Arara (after 18 matches), Maccabi Barkai (after 22 matches) and  Hapoel Muawiya (after 26 matches) folded and their results were annulled.

Sharon Division

Tel Aviv Division

Central Division

During the season, Hapoel Matzliah (after 25 matches) folded and its results were annulled.

References
Liga Gimel Upper Galilee The Israel Football Association 
Liga Gimel Jezreel The Israel Football Association 
Liga Gimel Samaria The Israel Football Association 
Liga Gimel Sharon The Israel Football Association 
Liga Gimel Tel Aviv The Israel Football Association 
Liga Gimel Central The Israel Football Association 

5
Liga Gimel seasons
Israel Liga Gimel